The Man from Nevada is a 1929 American silent Western film directed by J.P. McGowan and starring Tom Tyler, Natalie Joyce and Al Ferguson.

Cast
 Tom Tyler as Jack Carter 
 Natalie Joyce as Virginia Watkins 
 Al Ferguson as Luke Baldridge 
 Alfred Hewston as Jim Watkins 
 Kip Cooper as 'Wart' Watkins 
 Godfrey Craig as 'Wiggles' Watkins 
 Frank Hall Crane as 'Wobbles' Watkins 
 William L. Nolte as 'Bowery' Walker

References

External links
 

1929 films
1929 Western (genre) films
Films directed by J. P. McGowan
American black-and-white films
Silent American Western (genre) films
1920s English-language films
1920s American films